Wilson K-Factor refers to the generation of Wilson Sporting Goods tennis racquets that incorporate the "K-Factor" technology. These racquets were first revealed in 2007 and are still popular among players. Roger Federer as well as several other highly ranked players endorsed these racquets up until 2010 making them extremely popular for the short time as these racquets quickly became best sellers.

The K-Factor line of racquets boasts of having all of the strengths from the previous generation of  racquets while also having the unique "K-Factor".

 refers to the combining of Carbon Black from the original nCode racquets with graphite and SiO2 to create a dense and strong racquet matrix.

 refers to the two wings molded on each side of the racquet that increase dwell time of the ball when it hits the racquet thereby providing more control and comfort as well as a larger sweet spot.

 refers to the cross-sectional shape of the frame that enhances stiffness to increase stability of the racquet.

 refers to the shorter yoke design that improves stability, maneuverability, and handling.

References 

Tennis equipment